Essau  is a small town in north-western Gambia. It is located in Lower Niumi District in the North Bank Division.  As of 2009, it has an estimated population of 6,670.

Notable people
Edrissa Sonko
Mustapha Marong(Former Attorney General).
Alhaji Mafoday Sonko(Former MP,Member Of Parliament).
Nfamara Bintou Sonko(Former Colonial Chief).
Lang Sally Sonko(Former Colonial Chief).
Burungai Sonko(King Of Barra/Niumi,Born in Essau(As Fakebba Sonko)fought the 1831 war against King George IV).
Mansa Maranta Sonko(last King of Niumi,died in Essau Sukoto July 1910).

References

Populated coastal places in the Gambia
Lower Niumi